Saint-Agnant may refer to the following places in France:

Saint-Agnant, Charente-Maritime
Saint-Agnant-de-Versillat, in the Creuse 
Saint-Agnant-près-Crocq, in the Creuse

See also
Saint-Agnan (disambiguation)
Saint-Aignan (disambiguation)